Moordenaarsnek Pass, or just Moordenaarsnek (English: Murderer's Neck), is situated in the Eastern Cape, province of South Africa, on the regional road R56, between Mount Fletcher and Maclear, Eastern Cape.

Mountain passes of the Eastern Cape